Helichrysum pumilio is a species of flowering plant in the family Asteraceae, known colloquially as the wolbossie. It is found in southern Africa. An aromatic, it is used by birds such as the Cape sparrow in their nests, possibly as protection against parasites.

References

pumilio
Flora of South Africa